Silvia Dimitrov (born 22 January 1978) is a German former pair skater. She began competing internationally with Rico Rex in 1993. The pair placed sixth at the 1995 World Junior Championships in Budapest, eighth at the 1996 European Championships in Sofia, and 13th at the 1997 World Championships in Lausanne. Monika Scheibe coached the pair in Chemnitz. Dimitrov retired from competition due to injuries.

Programs 
(with Rico Rex)

Competitive highlights 
(with Rico Rex)

References 

1978 births
German female pair skaters
Living people
Sportspeople from Chemnitz